The Kemano Generating Station is situated 75 km (47 mi) southeast of Kitimat in the province of British Columbia, Canada. It was completed in 1954, providing  hydroelectricity for Alcan's Kitimat Aluminum smelter. The powerhouse is built in a cavern created 427 m (1,400 ft) inside the base of Mt Dubose. It produces 896 MW of power from its eight generator units, each of which has a capacity of 112 MW. It was the largest producer in the province when it was built, and is now the fifth largest electrical plant in British Columbia.

The Kemano I project was made possible by constructing the largest rockfill dam in the world at the time, the Kenney Dam on the east side of the Nechako reservoir, some 193 km (120 mi) to the east.
In 1995, the provincial government cancelled the Kemano Completion Project (Kemano II) that Alcan had been planning since 1987.

The smelter at Kitimat consumes about 80-85% of the plant's electricity, and the remainder is sold to BC Hydro's Powerex.

Other names 
Kemano I
Kemano project
Nechako-Kemano project
Kemano Hydro Project
Kemano Powerhouse
Kemano power station
Kemano Diversion
Kemano-Kitimat hydro
Kemano System
Kemano hydroelectric plant
Kemano generating facility
Kemano generating plant
Kemano Generating Station - is used by BC Hydro and the Province of British Columbia in legal documents.
Because the Kenney Dam and the Kemano powerhouse are miles apart and not connected, they don't share any name.

See also 

List of generating stations in British Columbia

References 

Hydroelectric power stations in British Columbia
Alcan
Rock-filled dams
Dams completed in 1954
Energy infrastructure completed in 1954
1954 establishments in British Columbia
Dams in British Columbia
Kitimat